Cedar Grove Cemetery is in Middlebush, Franklin Township, Somerset County, New Jersey.

History
In the 1940s the township of Franklin purchased and maintained 100 cemetery plots. The purpose was to create a Potter's Field. By 1975 the township only used 6 of the burial plots: they decided to sell the others.

Burials
 Colonel Routh Goshen
 Welsh Family, said to have donated the land for this cemetery. The family lived on Welshs Lane in East Millstone, NJ.

References

External links 
 
 

Cemeteries in Somerset County, New Jersey